Street Angels is a 1991 Australian television film directed by Kathy Mueller and starring Peta Brady, David Franklin, and Alexandra Sangster. It is about two social workers dealing with young children.

References

External links
Street Angels at Screen Australia
Street Angels at ABC

Australian television films
1991 television films
1991 films
Films directed by Kathy Mueller
1990s English-language films